Albert  H. Pearson (March 22, 1920 – November 16, 1963) was an American farmer and politician.

Born in Crystal Lake, Illinois, Pearson served in the United States Army during World War II. He studied accounting and was a dairy farmer. Pearson was involved in the Democratic Party, served on the McHenry County, Illinois Board of Commissioners, and on the school board. Pearson served in the Illinois House of Representatives in 1963. He died of a heart attack on his farm while pheasant hunting.

Notes

1920 births
1963 deaths
People from Crystal Lake, Illinois
Farmers from Illinois
Military personnel from Illinois
School board members in Illinois
County commissioners in Illinois
Democratic Party members of the Illinois House of Representatives
20th-century American businesspeople
20th-century American politicians
United States Army personnel of World War II